Krayem Maria Awad (born 1948) is a Vienna-based painter, sculptor and poet of Syrian origin.

He was born in Basir, and later moved to Austria, where he studied from 1968 telecommunications engineering at the Vienna Technical College, and was also enrolled at the Vienna School of Economics.

He also attended the Vienna Academy of Fine Arts.

In the 1970-1980s, he received international recognition for his numerous aquarelle work.

In the 1970s he participated in lectures as part of the creative movement "North-South Dialogue". He was a member of the editorial board of the magazine "Treffpunkte", and author of the manifesto "The Position of Women in European Civilization".

In 1977 he joined the art cooperative "Arbeitsgemeinschaft Kunst", offering courses in printing graphics and ceramics, and teaching at a summer art school in Vienna.

In the 1990s he worked with video installations, photography and computer graphics.

Since 1994, he has been involved in art-workshops and art courses in Switzerland.

Krayem uses mixed media when painting, mixing sand and ashes with oil-based pigments, and often supplements artwork with his own poetry.

Krayem often creates large format paintings, like the one titled "The whole", which measured 3x10 meters, and was on display at Vienna’s Jugendstiltheater in September 2008 :de:Steinhof (Wien).

He is a member of the International Club of visual artists "Art/Diagonal" .

Krayem's art work has been shown, as part of one man shows, in many European countries, as well as in Japan, South Africa, and the United States of America. His paintings are in public and private collections.

Works 
 1975 Mamma Eve
 1983 Wiener Kunsthefte 2/1983
 http://www.onb.ac.at/oe-literaturzeitschriften/
 1984 Österreichische Aquarellisten der Gegenwart. Facultas/Maudrich Verlag 
 1985 Aquarelle und Aphorismen
 1990 Bewegung und Ursprung '
 1991 Strukturen und Strukturveränderung
 1991 Stilles Wasser
 1991 Temps de quietude
 1995 Krayem Objekte
 1996 Berührung: Bilder und Ge danken, Published by Emi-Kunstverl. 
 2000 Toccare parola ed immagine. Emi Kunstverl. 
 2000 Krayem Malerei
 2001 Krayem Paintings
 2001 KrayemSculptures 1
 2002 Krayem Raum und Körper
 2002 Krayem Defragmentierung /
 2002 Krayem Angels
 2003 Krayem Defragmentierung I1.
 2003 FACES
 2004 Weltenfenster
 2004 Zeit der Stille
 2007 Das Tor Europa
 2008 Doors
 2009 Malen in Büroräumen
 2011 Wege einer Leidenschaft 
 2013 Gesicht der Erde CH
 2014 recovering I II III
 2015 vom Klang der Stille. Universitätszahnklinik Wien
 2016 Kunst und Heilkunst. Universitätszahnklinik Wien
 2018 Fenster zum Humanismus. Galerie Meier CH
 2019 Feminismus, luce dentro '

References

External links 
 artist’s website
 artist’s website in German
 
 
 b&find_code=WRD&adjacent=N&request=krayem+awad&x=10&y=9 Krayem's publications in the Austrian National Library
 https://web.archive.org/web/20100521023252/http://www.swissart.ch/galerie_meier/06_Awad-Krayem.html
 German National Library
 http://www.schwyzkultur.ch/nachrichten/faszination-der-begegnungen-1092.html
 http://www.emikunstverlag.com
 https://web.archive.org/web/20110724090218/http://www.swissart.net/galerie_meier/krayem-2010.html
 https://web.archive.org/web/20111204175851/http://www.galerie-arrigoni.ch/html/kunst_13_krayem.html
 http://www.kunstnet.at/kunstverein-mistelbach/03_03_29_6.html
 http://aleph.univie.ac.at:80/F/7H9K4A3DHEXYU861LFPVH7BVNEBNPPTP8UMMHT2SIARY7XHBDK-09721?func=find-b&request=krayem+awad&find_code=WRD&x=0&y=0

'

1948 births
Living people
Writers from Vienna
Austrian performance artists
Postmodern artists
20th-century Austrian painters
20th-century Austrian male artists
Austrian male painters
21st-century Austrian painters
21st-century Austrian male artists
20th-century Syrian painters
20th-century Syrian male artists
TU Wien alumni
Austrian male poets
Syrian poets
Academy of Fine Arts Vienna alumni
21st-century Syrian male artists
Syrian emigrants to Austria
Austrian people of Syrian descent